Vapaa ja yksin is the second studio album by Finnish pop singer-songwriter Chisu. It was released by Warner Music in Finland on September 23, 2009, and it peaked at number one on the Finnish Albums Chart. To date, the album has sold double platinum in Finland with over 58,000 copies.

Track listing
Digital download

Charts and certifications

Charts

Certifications

Year-end charts

References

See also
List of number-one albums of 2010 (Finland)

2009 albums
Chisu albums
Finnish-language albums